Zilling is a commune in the Moselle department in Grand Est in north-eastern France.

Population

See also
Communes of the Moselle department

References

External links

Local history page, written in French

Communes of Moselle (department)